Urban Development Directorate may refer to:

Urban Development Directorate (Bangladesh)
Urban Development Directorate (Uttarakhand)